Tallon Griekspoor defeated Benjamin Bonzi in the final, 4–6, 7–5, 6–3 to win the singles tennis title at the 2023 Maharashtra Open. It was his maiden ATP Tour singles title.

João Sousa was the reigning champion, but did not participate this year.

Seeds
The top four seeds receive a bye into the second round.

Draw

Finals

Top half

Bottom half

Qualifying

Seeds

Qualifiers

Qualifying draw

First qualifier

Second qualifier

Third qualifier

Fourth qualifier

References

External links
Singles draw
Qualifying draw

Maharashtra Open